Jerrilyn McGregory is a professor of African American folklore at Florida State University and an author. She wrote Wiregrass Country and Downhome Gospel; African American Spriritual Activism in Wiregrass Country. She has been researching celebrations of Boxing Day in the Caribbean.

Stephen Shearon in a 2012 review in American Music described the book as "significant and insightful, but flawed". Her book includes coverage of Maypole plaiting.

Bibliography
 
 
"Spatialized Ontologies: Toni Morrison's Science Fiction Traces in Gothic Spaces" Gothic Science Fiction: 1980-2010. Eds. Sara Wasson and Emily Alder. Liverpool: Liverpool University Press, 2011.
"'The Rest Is Up to You and Me': Sunday Morning Band and Ritual Identity in the Florida Panhandle." The Florida Folklife Reader. Ed. Tina Bucuvalas. Jackson: University Press of Mississippi, 2011.
"Fearless Ezekiel: Alterity in the Detective Fiction of Walter Mosley." Finding a Way Home: Critical Essays on Walter Mosley. Eds. Derek Maus and Owen Brady. Jackson; University Press of Mississippi, 2008.
"Playing in the Dark: Under the Big Top, the Africanist Presence." The Many Faces of Circus. Ed. Robert Sugarman. London: Cambridge Scholars Press, 2007.
"Nalo Hopkinson's Approach to Speculative Fiction." FEMSPEC, Vol. 6.1, 2005: 3-17.
"The Old Ship of Zion; The Afro-Baptist Ritual in the African Diaspora"

References

Year of birth missing (living people)
Living people